Oto Pustoslemšek (born 18 March 1943 in Mežica) is a Slovenian former alpine skier who competed for Yugoslavia in the 1964 Winter Olympics, finishing 62nd in the men's downhill and 67th in the men's giant slalom.

External links
 sports-reference.com
 

1943 births
Living people
Slovenian male alpine skiers
Olympic alpine skiers of Yugoslavia
Alpine skiers at the 1964 Winter Olympics
People from the Municipality of Mežica
20th-century Slovenian people